Gioele Pellino is a Grand Prix motorcycle racer from Italy.

Career statistics

By season

Races by year
(key) (Races in bold indicate pole position, races in italics indicate fastest lap)

References

External links
 Profile on motogp.com

1983 births
Living people
Italian motorcycle racers
125cc World Championship riders
People from Foligno
Sportspeople from the Province of Perugia